Small Faces were originally a British rhythm and blues band with a heavy mod following. They were later heavily praised and regarded as an influential psychedelic group with songs such as "Here Come the Nice","Itchycoo Park" and "Lazy Sunday" Formed in early 1965, the group originally included guitarist and lead singer Steve Marriott, bassist Ronnie Lane, keyboardist and guitarist Jimmy Winston and drummer Kenney Jones.

History 

Small Faces were formed in early 1965 by Steve Marriott, previously of the Moments, Ronnie Lane and Kenney Jones of the Outcasts and Marriott's acquaintance Jimmy Winston. Don Arden signed them onto Decca Records, and released their debut single "Whatcha Gonna Do About It" shortly thereafter. It managed to reach number 14 on the UK Singles Chart. The follow up single "I've Got Mine" was not nearly as successful, as it failed to chart in the UK.

Winston left the band for a solo career shortly after. In a 2000 interview, Kenney Jones 'stated' the reason Winston was fired from the band was because "He (Winston) got above his station and tried to compete with Steve Marriott." Reality is he left. Ian McLagan, of the Muleskinners, replaced Winston as the keyboardist. McLagan played his debut performance with them on 2 November 1965. After "Sha-La-La-La-Lee" became their first top ten hit, the Small Faces enjoyed widespread success, particularly in the UK and mainland Europe. It is commonly rumoured the group split on New Year's Eve of 1968, when Marriott stormed off stage, stating "I Quit". The truth is that they were actually obligated to  perform a few scheduled live performances during the earlier parts of 1969 before finally splitting, with Marriott forming Humble Pie, and the remaining Small Faces created Faces with Rod Stewart and Ronnie Wood, both formerly of The Jeff Beck Group.

Members

Session contributors

Timeline

Line-ups

References 

 
Small Faces